Witch Yoo Hee (also known as Witch Amusement), is a South Korean TV drama series broadcast by SBS in 2007.

Synopsis 
Ma Yoo Hee (Han Ga-in) is the executive of an advertising company. She would never be caught dead wearing make-up and only dresses in black. Her hairstyle and glasses are very business like looks, her only enjoyment in life appears to be the times when she's criticizing everything and anyone. All of her employees and co-workers fear her and she is constantly talked about when she's not around. Her stern and harsh nature has earned her the nickname 'witch' When it comes to romance she is hopeless. No matter how many blind dates she has, not one has ever led to a second. The reason for this is her negativity and her inability to loosen up and express herself. She is, however, completely oblivious of her faults and cannot comprehend why she is so bad when it comes to love.

Chae Mu-Ryong (Jae Hee) is an aspiring chef with a passion for French cuisine. He has an innate ability when it comes to taste and perfection. Every piece of food and every plate he prepares must be perfect. However this tends to get him into a lot of trouble because when working in a kitchen every moment counts and there is not possibly enough time to take so much care in preparation and decoration of meals. His criticism of a head chef's cooking causes him to lose his job. His parents have never really approved of his aspirations and dreams to be a famous chef and insist he return to medical school. He decides to enroll back into medical school but changes his mind at the last minute and decides not to.

Mu-Ryong discusses everything with his best friend and ends up going on a blind date to pretend to be someone else who backed out at the last minute. He declines at first since he already has a girlfriend, but his friend offers him money, and warns him however that the woman he will be meeting is rather different.

The woman he meets is Yoo Hee, and while under normal circumstances she would be rude, brash and boring, she tries to be nice and happy in an attempt to succeed on the date. However, her pretending is not very convincing and Mu-Ryong figures that it would be a matter of time before she loses it. The date ends when Mu-Ryong falls asleep for a moment, resulting in Yoo Hee throwing a glass of water at his face and calling him rude. He retorts back to her also, telling her to take care of her appearance the next time she goes on a blind date. The two then leave on bad terms.

While delivering food from his father's Chinese restaurant, Mu-Ryong becomes involved in a car accident, coincidentally with Yoo Hee. They exchange insurance information and Yoo Hee learns that he lied to her on their date, realizing that he is 1 year younger than her, and that he met her only as a favor to a friend.

Yoo Hee demands the money for the damage to her car to be paid within a week. However, Mu-Ryong doesn't have any money, and yet Yoo Hee is unwilling to compromise with him. He decides to use his school tuition, which was given to him by his parents, to pay for her car. However, he loses the money after being mugged on the way to pay her.

Mu-Ryong tells Yoo Hee he doesn't have the money but is willing to work it off, no matter how long it takes or what he must do for her to pay her back. Yoo Hee decides that Mu-Ryong could repay her by working as her house keeper, since she continuously loses her previous keepers.

Meanwhile, Mu-Ryongs girlfriend Seung Mi who works at her father's restaurant, is expecting a new head chef: Johnny Kruger (Dennis Oh), a world-renowned chef who also happens to be Mu-Ryong's idol and an acquaintance of Yoo Hee as well. Also her first love (Yoo Joon Ha) comes back from studying abroad and is now a renowned doctor. She sees him at a college reunion but is completely embarrassed when her friend (Sae Ra) pulls down her skirt and Yoo Hee is wearing Minnie Mouse boxers.

As Moo Ryung is working as housekeeper he realizes that Yoo Hee has not been on dates for a while and is continuously being rejected on her blind dates. One night while drinking Moo Ryung doesn't understand why Yoo Hee get so upset when she's dumped when she shows up on dinner dates dressed like a spy. She then challenges him to fix her love life and if he is successful she will forget about the debt. He agrees. They agree to a contract.

He begins by changing her entire wardrobe then her cold manner. He repeats in his lessons, "smile", "be kind and gentle" and "be polite". She gradually changes but completely blows a good date when she flips him on his back for putting his hands on her hip in an effort to keep her from falling. She tries to be more feminine and gets much better response from men but she realizes finding love is easier said than done. She asks him if he can continue to be her pretend boyfriend unless he can find her a lover. He again agrees but thinks Johnny could be the possible candidate.

Yoo Hee continues to take the dating tips and Moo Ryung continues to be her pretend boyfriend, but since Moo Ryung already has a girlfriend(Seung Mi) there are a lot of misunderstandings. Seung Mi is uncomfortable with him living in Yoo Hee's house: part jealousy and pride and part insecurities. Yoo Hee also continues to fall in love with her first love, who is engaged. She keeps her distance until Sae Ra tells her he broke off the engagement. Joon Ha invites her to dinner where Yoo Hee's feelings for him grow. She invites him to a drink and she asks if they can date but he walks out on her because he has made a deal with her father, just like before. Yoo Hee's father made a deal with Joon Ha when Yoo Hee and him were both in college. If Joon Ha stop seeing his daughter he would fund Joon Ha's studies abroad.

Feeling for each other(Yoo Hee and Joon Ha) grow deeper, but soon she learns that Joon Ha only loves her because of her father and his financial gains from the relationship. She leaves him on the altar and runs away to the country, but they are found by Yoo Hee's manager. She returns to her father, but confesses her love for Moo Ryung. For some period they seem to have a good and honest relationship. It's romantic and sweet. Moo Ryung tells her often how much he loves her unlike Joon Ha who thinks saying "love you" is childish. He continuously interrupts the relationship by wanting to see Yoo Hee. He threatens Moo Ryung while Yoo Hee's father ruins his own daughter by destroying her advertising company and cancelling her credit cards.

Because of the constant phone calls and run ins, she ultimately meet with Joon Ha. He tells her that he loves her, but she's disgusted and leaves because she know it's a lie. He ends up getting into an "accident" and can never use his hand again: meaning the end of his career as a surgeon. She then leaves Moo Ryung and goes to his bedside. The engagement and wedding is back on even though it is clear that she does not love him nor does he. In celebration they (Joon Ha, Yoo Hee, and Yoo Hee's father) go to lunch. Joon Ha could not pick up his knife to cut because of his hand so Yoo Hee cuts for him. Then she gets a call from Johnny. She leaves the table to answer it. Johnny tells her that he's leaving for New York the next day and that Moo Ryung is going too. She hangs up but is devastated. She hears her father from behind the curtain telling Joon Ha to give up the hospital before Yoo Hee gets suspicious and to not mess up this time. Joon Ha has no objection but grabs the cup of water with his "broken hand".

Yoo Hee goes to the hospital the next day to confirm what she saw at the restaurant. She sees Joon Ha walking across the hall ready to go do a surgery. His cast is gone and his hand is fine. She catches him and her father both in a lie together. She walks away disgusted but her father has a heart attack and decides to stay.

Moo Ryung is at the airport with Johnny waiting, wishing that Yoo Hee comes to see him. When Yoo Hee's father wakes up he is embarrassed by what he has done and tells her to leave. Then Joon Ha waiting outside the door and tries to make one last attempt to make her stay with him but she tells that she has to see Moo Ryung and he offers her a ride. She meets Moo Ryung. He did not get on the plane because of her and they embrace and kiss.

Cast

Main
 Han Ga-in as Ma Yoo Hee
 Park Bo-young as young Yoo Hee
 Jae Hee as Chae Moo Ryong 
 Kim Jeong-hoon as Yoo Joon Ha 
 Dennis Oh as Johnny Kruger
 Jeon Hye-bin as Nam Seung Mi

Extended
 Ahn Suk-hwan as Chae Byung Seo (Moo Ryong's father) 
 Song Ok-sook as Moo Ryong's mother
 Sung Dong-il as Lee Tim Chang
 Hwang Ji-hyun as Han Sae Ra (Yoo Hee's friend)
 Byun Hee-bong as Ma Yoon Hoon (Yoo Hee's father)
 Jo Kye-hyung as Chae Song Hwa (Moo Ryong's brother)
 Choi Eun-joo as Song Hwa's girlfriend
 Jennifer Bae as Alison
 Han Young-kwang
 Moon Ga-young
 Baek Hyun-suh
 Lee Joong-yul
 Kang San
 Ban Ya-sung

Episode ratings

Source: TNS Media Korea

International broadcast
It aired in Thailand on Channel 7 beginning June 7, 2008, dubbed as Kubduk Huajai Yai Maemod. ("กับดักหัวใจยัยแม่มด", literally: Witch Heart Trap).

It aired in Malaysia on Ntv7 (Malaysia) in 2010.

It was also aired in the Philippines in May 2008 via GMA Network and was one of the highest rated shows in the country.

References

External links 
  SBS Official Website
 
  Han Ga In - The unofficial fanclub
  Witch Yoo Hee Reviews - spcnet.tv

Seoul Broadcasting System television dramas
2007 South Korean television series debuts
2007 South Korean television series endings
Korean-language television shows
South Korean romantic comedy television series